Jaroslav Dušek (born 30 April 1961) is a Czech actor.

Selected filmography

Film
 Kouř (1991)
 Cosy Dens (1999)
 Divided We Fall (2000)
 Želary (2003)
 Pupendo (2003)
 Mazaný Filip (2003)
 Up and Down (2004)
 Lunacy (2005)
 Zrcadlení tmy (2020) 
 Where Butterflies Don't Fly (2022)
 Indián (2022)

Television
 Dokoláč (2000)
 Wasteland (2016)

Play
 U výčepu (2010)

References

External links
 

 
1961 births
Living people
Male actors from Prague
Czech male film actors
Czech male stage actors
Czech male television actors
21st-century Czech male actors
20th-century Czech male actors